Pattern glare is a form of visual discomfort, arising from viewing repetitively striped patterns, such as those of op art. Instead of the patterns' appearing as they are, they may appear to move, to shimmer, or to vary in shape over time.

References

Visual disturbances and blindness